Endurance Abinuwa (born 31 July 1987) is a Nigerian sprinter. She competed in the 2012 Summer Olympics.

References

1987 births
Living people
Athletes (track and field) at the 2012 Summer Olympics
Nigerian female sprinters
Olympic athletes of Nigeria
UTEP Miners women's track and field athletes
Olympic female sprinters
20th-century Nigerian women
21st-century Nigerian women